Roger Goupillières (22 September 1896 - 20 December 1988) was a French film director and screenwriter.

Filmography

Director 
 1926: La Petite Fonctionnaire
 1928: Jalma la double
 1929: La Voix de sa maîtresse
 1931: Le Poignard malais
 1931: Échec et mat
 1933: 
 1936: 
 1938:

Assistant-director 
 1930:  by Jean de Limur

Screenwriter 
1928: Jaima la double

References

External links 
 

French film directors
20th-century French screenwriters
Film people from Rouen
1896 births
1988 deaths